Espinosa de los Caballeros is a municipality located in the province of Ávila, Castile and León, Spain. According to the 2006 census (INE), the municipality has a population of 110 inhabitants.  Located northeast of the province of Avila, is in an agricultural landscape, bounded on the north by Arévalo, and close to Adanero.

History
This small town in the district of La Morana, is known for the important role that the place had in the times of the Templars, and is also one of the most important place for the so-called commoner. Hence the name the area "Tierra Comunera."

References 

Municipalities in the Province of Ávila